The Department of Trade and Industry (abbreviated as DTI) is the executive department of the Philippine government tasked as the main economic catalyst that enables innovative, competitive, job generating, inclusive business, and empowers consumers. It acts as a catalyst for intensified private sector activity in order to accelerate and sustain economic growth through comprehensive industrial growth strategy, progressive and socially responsible trade liberalization and deregulation programs and policymaking designed for the expansion and diversification of Philippine trade – both domestic and foreign.

Department Order No. 19-18, s. 2019, laid out the organizational structure of the department into the following functional groups: Competitiveness and Innovation Group (CIG); Consumer Protection Group (CPG); Industry Development and Trade Policy Group (IDTPG); Management Services Group (MSG); Regional Operations Group (ROG); and the Trade Promotions Group (TPG).

Its hierarchical organization include 27 foreign trade service posts, 17 regional offices (including Negros Island Region), 87 provincial/city/area offices, 12 bureaus, 4 attached agencies, 7 attached corporations, and 8 services offices.

The department is headed by a Secretary (equivalent to Minister) and assisted by Undersecretaries (equivalent to Deputy Minister) which take charge of certain sub-department each, and Assistant Secretaries which serve as specialized assistants of the Secretary.

History

Department of Commerce and Police
On September 6, 1901, the Philippine Commission established the Department of Commerce (and Police) of the Insular Government.  William Cameron Forbes future Governor-General of the Philippines served as its commissioner from 1904 through 1908.

Department of Commerce and Industry (DCI)
After World War II, President Manuel Roxas issued Executive Order (EO) No. 94 on October 4, 1947, creating the Department of Commerce and Industry (DCI). Cornelio Balmaceda, a much sought-after professor of economics and director of the Bureau of Commerce (BOC), was appointed acting secretary of the newly created Department of Commerce and Industry.

Prior to EO 94, the Bureau of Commerce was tasked to develop and promote the country's trade and industry, under the overall supervision of the Department of Agriculture and Commerce, as stipulated by Act 4007 by the Philippine Legislature, enacted on December 5, 1932.

By 1972, the DCI had grown into a big organization with 10 regular bureaus and 22 agencies under its direct supervision. The DCI was mandated to promote, develop, expand, regulate and control of foreign and domestic trade and industry, as well as tourism.

To have closer supervision and to ensure more effective delivery of services, President Ferdinand E. Marcos issued Presidential Decree (PD) 189 on May 11, 1973, creating the Department of Tourism to handle all tourism-related matters. A year later on June 21, 1974, Marcos issued PD 488 creating the Department of Industry whose principal function was to promote and enhance the growth of the country's existing and thriving industries.

On June 2, 1975, the Department of Trade was created under PD 721 to pursue efforts of the government toward strengthening the country's socio-economic development, particularly in the area of commercial activities. A key strategy of the new department was vigorous export promotion to generate much needed foreign exchange. A Bureau of Foreign Trade was also particularly established to push for domestic trade and marketing programs.

In the early 1980s, this goal of national economic development required the need to hew industrial promotion efforts with the expansion of Philippine trade overseas. This resulted in the creation of the Ministry of Trade and Industry (MOTI) on July 27, 1981, which took over the functions of the subsequently abolished Departments of Trade and of Industry.

Drastic changes followed after the 1986 EDSA Revolution. President Corazon Aquino signed Executive Order No. 133 on February 27, 1987, effectively reorganizing the Ministry of Trade and Industry and renaming it the Department of Trade and Industry (DTI). This was further strengthened by the issuance of Executive Order 292 (Administrative Code of 1987). Other latter legislations have also amended its functions and structures.

Organizational structure
The department is headed by the Secretary of Trade and Industry (Philippines) with the following six undersecretaries and assistant secretaries:
 Undersecretary for Competitiveness and Ease of Doing Business Group
 Undersecretary for Consumer Protection Group
 Undersecretary for Industry Development and Trade Policy Group
 Undersecretary for Management Services Group
 Undersecretary for Regional Operations Group
 Undersecretary for Trade and Investments Promotion Group
 Assistant Secretary for Competitiveness and Ease of Doing Business Group
 Assistant Secretary for Consumer Protection Group
 Assistant Secretaries for Industry Development and Trade Policy Group
 Assistant Secretary for Management Services Group
 Assistant Secretaries for Regional Operations Group
 Assistant Secretary for Trade and Investments Promotion Group

List of the Secretaries of Trade and Industry

Attached Agencies and Corporations
The following are attached to the Department of Trade and Industry:
 Board of Investments (BOI)
 Center for International Trade Expositions and Missions (CITEM)
 Construction Industry Authority of the Philippines (CIAP)
 Cooperative Development Authority (CDA)
 Design Center of the Philippines (DCP)
 Philippine Trade Training Center (PTTC)
 Intellectual Property Office of the Philippines (IPOPHL)
 National Development Company (NDC)
 Philippine Economic Zone Authority (PEZA)
 Philippine International Trading Corporation (PITC)
 Philippine Pharma Procurement Incorporated (PPPI)
 Small Business Corporation (SB Corp)
 Technical Education and Skills Development Authority (TESDA)

Attached agencies are actually sub-agencies of any national departments of the national government organization in the Philippines in which creation is established by special laws and its operation is independent of its mother unit. The mother unit only serves as supervisory on these special attached agencies.

See also
 List of company registers
 United States Department of Commerce

References

External links

Department of Trade and Industry website
Philippine Business Registry website

 
Philippines
Philippines
Philippines, Trade and Industry
Trade and Industry